Peter Julian Curtin (31 January 1944 – 18 May 2014) was an Australian television and stage actor, whose career began when he joined the Melbourne Theatre Company, appearing in The Plough and the Stars with Wendy Hughes.

Personal life

Curtin married actress Ailsa Piper in 1987. Curtin died, aged 70, on 18 May 2014.

Filmography
Homicide as Henry Cooper/Ray Gardiner (1965)
Winner Take All (1975)
Bluey as Blair Thompson /Dave Brown (1976–1977)
Cop Shop (1978) 
Skyways as David Kerridge
Blood Money (1980) as Dan
The Last Outlaw (1980)  as Const. Richards
Prisoner as Solicitor /Ian Mahoney / Det. Thorn (1980-1986)
I Can Jump Puddles (1981) as Flagger
And Here Comes Bucknuckle (1981)  as Achilles Jones
Carson's Law as Det. Sgt. Clem Harvey
The Zoo Family (1985) as David Mitchell
Handle with Care (1986) as Paul
The Flying Doctors as Clive Hayes (1986)
Whose Baby (1986) as Noel Jenkins
Mission: Impossible as Colonel Joseph Batz / Dr. Philip Westerly (1988–1990)
Inside Running (1989)
Embassy as Green (1990)
Time Trax as Sheriff Dobbs (1993)
A Country Practice as Sandy Davis (1993)
Official Denial (1994) as Jonathon Applegate
Blue Heelers as Commander Reg Jones  (1994–2004)
In Pursuit of Honor (1995) as Sgt. Ernest Gruber
English: Have a Go (1996)
Stingers as Doug Piper/Judge Frost (1999–2003)
The Games as Mr. Cabsav  (2000)
SeaChange as Port Deakin Mayor (2000)
Satisfaction as Dr. De Courcy (2009-2010)
City Homicide as Leigh Carrington (2008)
House Husbands as John (2013)
Party Tricks as the Opposition leader (2014)

References

External links

1944 births
2014 deaths
Australian male television actors
Australian male stage actors
Australian people of Irish descent
20th-century Australian male actors
21st-century Australian male actors